The Walls Group is an American urban contemporary gospel group signed to RCA Records. The group consists of four siblings: two sisters, Rhea Walls and Ahjah Walls, and two brothers, Darrel Walls and Alic "Paco" Walls. 

In 2012, the group broke through on the Billboard charts with their album The Walls Group, released on June 11, 2012. On September 2, 2014, they released their debut studio album, Fast Forward, with RCA Records and Fo Yo Soul Recordings, which charted on the Billboard 200.

History
The Houston, Texas-based urban contemporary gospel quartet, The Walls Group, was started in 2009. It is made up of the oldest four of eight siblings; from oldest to youngest: Darrel McGlothen Walls, born February 8, 1991; Rhea Walls, born September 19, 1995; Alic (Paco) Walls, born July 7, 1996; and Ahjah Walls, born November 20, 1997 to Parents Roger and Alicia Wall, affectionately known as Mom and Pop Walls. 

(The Walls Group have four younger siblings - Michea, Talia, Nicco, and China Walls - who form the group Walls Infinity, a younger version of The Walls Group. Their grandmother and her sister sing as well.)

The quartet released The Walls Group, with Wall2Wall Entertainment, on June 11, 2012, and the album charted on the Billboard Top Gospel Albums chart at No. 29. This caught the attention of Kirk Franklin, who signed them to Fo Yo Soul Recordings in association with RCA Records.

On their new label, they released their first studio album on September 2, 2014, Fast Forward. The album charted on the Billboard 200 chart at No. 39, and at the No. 1 spot on the Top Gospel Albums chart. The album got two four star out of five reviews from AllMusic's Andy Kellman and Dwayne Lacy of New Release Tuesday, and Daniel Cody of Wade-O Radio says "It's not stale, it's not boring, it's not repetitive, but it is an exciting and fresh album." The group was nominated for Best Gospel Performance/Song at the 57th Annual Grammy Awards, for their song "Love on the Radio". The quartet was nominated at the 30th Stellar Awards in several categories such as: Artist of the Year, Group/Duo of the Year, CD of the Year, the Contemporary Group/Duo of the Year, Contemporary CD of the Year, and Music Video of the Year.

In the beginning of 2020, it was announced that The Walls Group was signed to Warryn Campbell's "My Block" record label along with many other artists.

Solo Endeavors 
Every member of the group, excluding Rhea, has partnered with The Session, an independent musical platform. Each member has sung a cover of a song. The videos have been uploaded to YouTube. 

Alic Walls, known by his solo stage name Alic, has been releasing and promoting solo (and explicit) secular music. He has released several albums between 2020 and 2021.

Members
 Darrel Walls - tenor
 Rhea Walls - soprano
 Alic “Paco” Walls - baritone
 Ahjah Walls - alto

Discography

Studio albums

*- Denotes an album didn't chart, or was not released in that category.

Awards and nominations

References

External links
Fo Yo Soul Recordings profile

American gospel musical groups
Musical groups established in 2009
RCA Records artists